"Magic" is a song recorded by British-Australian singer Olivia Newton-John for the soundtrack to the 1980 musical fantasy film, Xanadu. Written and produced by John Farrar, the song was released as the lead single from the album in May 1980 and topped the US Billboard Hot 100 for four weeks beginning on August 2. On August 30, it was displaced from the top by Christopher Cross's "Sailing".

In Canada, "Magic" spent two weeks at number one on the RPM Top Singles chart. The single also reached number four in Australia and number 32 on the UK Singles Chart. It also became Newton-John's biggest Billboard Adult Contemporary hit, spending five weeks at the top of the chart, and also topped the RPM Adult Contemporary chart for a week. Billboard ranked "Magic" as the third most popular single of 1980, behind only "Call Me" by Blondie and "Another Brick in the Wall (Part 2)" by Pink Floyd.

John Lennon named "Magic" and "All Over the World" by the Electric Light Orchestra (ELO) as two recent songs he liked in a Newsweek interview in September 1980, shortly before his assassination.

Record World called it an "infectious pop ballad [that] has a big beat production treatment".

In a lawsuit involving the use of "Magic" in a high school musical performance, the US Court of Appeals for the Ninth Circuit described the song as follows:

Both US and UK B-sides also appear in Xanadu:
US: "Fool Country" is one of three single B-sides to appear in the film but not on the soundtrack. This is featured in the nightclub grand opening segment following the film's title track and before its reprise.  
UK: "Whenever You're Away from Me" (a duet with Gene Kelly), also appears as the B-side of the US "Xanadu" single.

Track listing and formats 
All tracks written and produced by John Farrar.
US 7-inch vinyl single (MCA Records)
A1. "Magic" – 4:25
B1. "Fool Country" – 2:29

UK 7-inch vinyl single (Jet Records)
A1. "Magic" – 4:25
B1. "Whenever You're Away from Me" – 4:22

Personnel 
 Olivia Newton-John – lead and backing vocals
 John Farrar – electric guitars, electric piano, synthesizers and backing vocals
 David Hungate – bass
 Carlos Vega – drums and percussion
Additional personnel
 Strings arranged and conducted by Richard Hewson
 David J. Holman – engineering and mixing

Charts

Weekly charts

Year-end charts

All-time charts

Certifications and sales

2011 version 

"Magic (Peach & DJ Dan Murphy remix)" is a remix of the song. In May 2011, it was remixed by two Australians, DJ Dan Murphy and Steve Peach, to create a dance version. Newton-John went back to the studio to re-sing the vocals. The version was sponsored by WACCI, a humanitarian group.

Everybody who worked on the project volunteered their time, with all proceeds being donated to Newton-John's charity, the Olivia Newton-John Cancer and Wellness Centre.

Newton-John was presented the world premiere of the song on the Australian edition of Dancing with the Stars on Sunday May 22, 2011. The song was released exclusively on Australian iTunes that same day.

Music video 
A video was shot for the new remix in Sydney in an attempt to break the Guinness Book World Record for largest cast in a music video by featuring 350 people. Newton-John does not appear in the video, which was directed by DJ Dan Murphy.

Chart performance

Cover versions 

The song is included in the film Xanadu and also the Xanadu musical.
A version of the song by Stimulator was used in commercials for Macy's. This cover was also used in the film Ella Enchanted and appeared on the film's soundtrack.
Another updated version of the song was performed by Meaghan Martin for the Disney Channel Original Movie Wizards of Waverly Place: The Movie. It was subsequently included on the television series and the film's soundtrack album.
 In 2015, the singer/pianist character performed the song in Part I of the HBO mini-series Olive Kitteridge.
In 2015 Newton-John teamed with her daughter Chloe Lattanzi and Dave Aude to rework the song's chorus into a new recording, "You Have to Believe". The song went to number one on the US Dance Club Songs chart.
Juliana Hatfield covered the song on her album Juliana Hatfield Sings Olivia Newton-John.
In 2018, Delta Goodrem performed the song in the mini-series Olivia Newton-John: Hopelessly Devoted to You and the accompanying soundtrack album, I Honestly Love You.

See also 
List of Billboard Adult Contemporary number ones of 1980
List of Billboard Hot 100 number ones of 1980
List of Cash Box Top 100 number-one singles of 1980

References

External links 
 

1980 singles
Olivia Newton-John songs
Billboard Hot 100 number-one singles
Cashbox number-one singles
Songs written by John Farrar
Songs from Xanadu (film)
Song recordings produced by John Farrar
RPM Top Singles number-one singles
1980 songs
Jet Records singles
MCA Records singles